This is a list of prime ministers of Cameroon since the country gained independence from France in 1960 to the present day.

The current Prime Minister of Cameroon is Joseph Ngute, since 4 January 2019.

List of officeholders

Political parties

Officeholders

See also
Cameroon
President of Cameroon
List of presidents of Cameroon
Prime Minister of Cameroon
List of colonial governors of Cameroon
List of heads of government of French Cameroon
List of heads of government of British Cameroons
Politics of Cameroon 
Lists of office-holders

External links
Official Website
World Statesmen – Cameroon

Cameroon
Government of Cameroon
Politics of Cameroon